The 1960 United States Senate election in Maine was held on November 8, 1960. Incumbent Republican U.S. Senator Margaret Chase Smith was re-elected to a third term over Democratic State Senator Lucia Cormier.

This was the first election in U.S. Senate history in which all candidates or all major-party candidates were women. This was the first U.S. Senate election in Maine that was held in November, rather than in September.

Republican primary

Candidates
 Margaret Chase Smith, U.S. Senator since 1949

Results
Senator Smith was unopposed for renomination

Democratic primary

Candidates
Lucia Cormier, State Representative from Rumford

Results
Representative Cormier was unopposed for the Democratic nomination.

General election

Results

See also 
 1960 United States Senate elections

References

Maine
1960